James Brian McCusker (May 19, 1936 – February 13, 2015) was a professional American football defensive tackle in the National Football League (NFL) and the American Football League (AFL). He played for the NFL's Chicago Cardinals (1958), Philadelphia Eagles (1959–1962), and Cleveland Browns (1963) and the AFL's New York Jets (1964). After his retirement, he owned a restaurant and bar called "The Pub" in his hometown of Jamestown, New York with his wife, Mary.

References

1936 births
2015 deaths
Sportspeople from Jamestown, New York
Players of American football from New York (state)
American football defensive tackles
Pittsburgh Panthers football players
Chicago Cardinals players
Cleveland Browns players
Philadelphia Eagles players
New York Jets players
American Football League players